Caenogenesis (also variously spelled cenogenesis, kainogenesis, kenogenesis) is the introduction during embryonic development of characters or structure not present in the earlier evolutionary history of the strain or species, as opposed to palingenesis. Notable examples include the addition of the placenta in mammals.

Caenogenesis constitutes a violation to Ernst Haeckel's biogenetic law and was explained by Haeckel as adaptation to the peculiar conditions of the organism's individual development. Other authorities, such as Wilhelm His, Sr., on the contrary saw embryonic differences as precursors to adult differences.

See also
Ontogeny
Recapitulation theory

References

Bibliography 
Gould, S.J. 1977. Ontogeny and Phylogeny. Cambridge: Harvard University Press.

Developmental biology